Leaana Ronnie Posini is a Samoan politician and Member of the Legislative Assembly of Samoa. He is a member of the Human Rights Protection Party.

He was first elected to the Legislative Assembly of Samoa in the 2016 Samoan general election. An electoral petition against him by the unsuccessful candidate Palusalue Faʻapo II was withdrawn before going to trial. In July 2019 he was one of 18 MPs who voted in support of Lands & Titles Court President Fepuleai Atila Ropati, who had been convicted for assault, retaining his position.

He was re-elected at the 2021 Samoan general election. On 12 July 2021 he agreed to resign from parliament as part of the settlement of an election petition. He subsequently changed his mind, and the petition against him was later withdrawn. 

In November 2022 he was banished from his village of Saanapu by the village council.

References

Living people
Members of the Legislative Assembly of Samoa
Human Rights Protection Party politicians
Year of birth missing (living people)